František Bočko (born 9 July 1941) is a Slovak gymnast. He competed in eight events at the 1968 Summer Olympics.

References

1941 births
Living people
Slovak male artistic gymnasts
Olympic gymnasts of Czechoslovakia
Gymnasts at the 1968 Summer Olympics
Sportspeople from Bratislava